"Last Snowdome" is the 14th single released by Nana Kitade. The single was released December 19, 2016 during Kitade's Rainer Hall Christmas Live 2016 event. The single was later made available for purchase on her official site. The single was released in two versions. A vinyl version containing only the single, and a limited metal box edition containing the single on CD, a heart-shaped guitar pick, and a Christmas card signed by Nana Kitade.

Track listing

References

External links
 Official Website

2016 singles
Nana Kitade songs
Songs written by Nana Kitade
2016 songs